Begum Monsura Mohiuddin was a Jatiya Party (Ershad) politician and the former Member of Parliament of Nilphamari-1. She was the eldest daughter of former Senior Minister Mashiur Rahman (Jadu Mia) and sister of former cabinet minister Shawfikul Ghaani Shapan. She was married to former diplomat and Permanent Representative of Bangladesh to the United Nations A. H. G. Mohiuddin. She died on 25 November 2021.

Career
Mohiuddin was elected to parliament from Nilphamari-1 as a Jatiya Party candidate in 1986 and 1988.

References

20th-century births
2021 deaths
Jatiya Party politicians
3rd Jatiya Sangsad members
4th Jatiya Sangsad members
Women members of the Jatiya Sangsad
Year of birth missing
People from Nilphamari District